Jean Louis Cabanis (8 March 1816 – 20 February 1906) was a German ornithologist.

Cabanis was born in Berlin to an old Huguenot family who had moved from France. Little is known of his early life. He studied at the University of Berlin from 1835 to 1839, and then travelled to North America, returning in 1841 with a large natural history collection. He was assistant and later director of the Natural History Museum of Berlin (which was at the time the Berlin University Museum), taking over from Martin Lichtenstein. He founded the Journal für Ornithologie in 1853, editing it for the next forty-one years, when he was succeeded by his son-in-law Anton Reichenow.

He died in Friedrichshagen.

A number of birds are named after him, including Cabanis's bunting Emberiza cabanisi, Cabanis's spinetail Synallaxis cabanisi, Azure-rumped tanager Poecilostreptus cabanisi and Cabanis's greenbul Phyllastrephus cabanisi.

References

External links
 Digitised copy of Cabanis' book Museum Heineanum: Verzeichniss der ornithologischen Sammlung des Oberamtmann Ferdinand Heine, auf Gut St. Burchard vor Halberstadt ('Directory of the ornithological collection of the chief magistrate Ferdinand Heine, on St. Burchard near Halberstadt')

1816 births
1906 deaths
German ornithologists
Scientists from Berlin
People from the Province of Brandenburg
Humboldt University of Berlin alumni
Academic staff of the Humboldt University of Berlin
Journal of Ornithology editors